Javier Antonio Flórez Valoyes (born 18 May 1982) is a Colombian retired professional footballer.

Criminal case
Flórez was jailed in 2009 for shooting dead a fan after a game. Flórez, a midfielder was playing for Junior Barranquilla against Once Caldas in a two-leg match. The victim, 33-year-old Israel Cantillo, was shot twice, and Flórez fled the scene.

Cantillo was a fan of Flórez's team Junior.

Flórez's lawyers agreed to pay $150 million compensation to the victim's family, and as a consequence Flórez was released from jail in September 2009.

Flórez has cited both self-defence, and being drunk, as the reasons for his crime.

References

1982 births
Living people
Colombian footballers
Colombian expatriate footballers
Atlético Junior footballers
Atlético Bucaramanga footballers
Uniautónoma F.C. footballers
Cúcuta Deportivo footballers
Unión Deportivo Universitario players
Boyacá Chicó F.C. footballers
Categoría Primera A players
Categoría Primera B players
Liga Panameña de Fútbol players
Colombian people convicted of murder
Association football midfielders
Footballers from Barranquilla
Colombian expatriate sportspeople in Panama
Expatriate footballers in Panama
20th-century Colombian people
21st-century Colombian people